Vahdat  (formerly Ҷиргатол/Jirgatol, Kyrgyz: Jerge-Tal) is a town and jamoat in Tajikistan. It is the seat of Lakhsh District (formerly Jirgatol District), one of the Districts of Republican Subordination. The population of the town is 6,400 (January 2020 estimate).

Notes

References

Populated places in Districts of Republican Subordination
Jamoats of Tajikistan